final of 2015–16 Kuwait Emir Cup.

Details

References

External links
Kuwait League Fixtures and Results at FIFA
Kuwaiti Super Cup (Arabic)
xscores.com Kuwait 
goalzz.com - Super Cup
RSSSF.com - Kuwait - List of Champions

Emir Cup
Kuwait Emir Cup finals
Kuwait SC matches